Polyhedroid may refer to:

 A 4-polytope
 A form of agate crystal